This is a list of flags used in Papua New Guinea.

National flag

Flag of the Governor-General

Ensigns

Provincial flags

Historical flags

Foreign Power Flags

Royal flags

National flags

Viceregal flags

Sporting flags

Proposed flags

See also

Notes

References

External links

Papua New Guinea at Flags of the World

Flags
Flags
Lists and galleries of flags